Walter Hancock (16 June 1799 – 14 May 1852) was an English inventor of the Victorian period. He is chiefly remembered for his steam-powered road vehicles, but also received a patent for preparing and cutting natural rubber into sheets. He was the younger brother of Thomas Hancock, the inventor of rubber mastication who is also claimed by some to be the inventor of rubber vulcanization.

Hancock's steam buses

Between 1824 and 1836 in Stratford, near London, Hancock constructed a number of steam-powered road vehicles. In 1827 he patented a steam boiler constructed with separate chambers of thin metal which could split rather than explode, a safety measure for operators and passengers. His were not the first road locomotives: experiments by Richard Trevithick occurred a generation earlier with his Puffing Devil and London Steam Carriage; but they were the most successful. It will also be noted that railways were being introduced in England at about the same time as Hancock's enterprises.

In 1831, Hancock gave evidence to a Parliamentary select committee on steam carriages.

"Infant"
In 1829 he built a small 10 seat bus called the Infant, with which in 1831 he began a regular service between Stratford and central London. On 31 October 1832, the Infant took an experimental trip to Brighton. This vehicle was later made famous by its revenue earning journeys between London and Brighton, which were a British first, and also demonstrated its usability by successfully ascending a frozen slope of 5 degrees where horse-drawn coaches were struggling.

"Enterprise"

On 22 April 1833 Hancock's steam omnibus Enterprise (built for the London and Paddington Steam Carriage Company) began a regular service between London Wall and Paddington via Islington. It was the first regular steam carriage service, and was the first mechanically propelled vehicle specially designed for omnibus work to be operated. During this vehicle's construction in 1832, a negligent engineer died of fright when a boiler component tore, expelling high-pressure steam in his direction. Neither he nor anyone else present was physically injured in any way, and the machinery itself suffered no significant damage.<ref name="experiments">Hancock, Walter. Narrative of Twelve Years' Experiments (1824– 1836) Demonstrative of the Practicability and Advantage of Employing Steam-Carriages, John Weale and J. Mann, London 1838. Accessed at archive.org</ref>

The Enterprise had several features which were innovative by contemporary standards. The engine was suspended on leaf springs along with the body of the vehicle, and the axle located with swinging arms as is still done today in most pickup trucks, with power being transmitted to the axle using chain drive. The rear axle was also used to drive a centrifugal blower fan which was used to force air into the firebox.

The Enterprise required three operators in normal running. The driver sat at the front and was responsible for steering (via a steering wheel rather than a tiller) and controlling the speed via a regulator. A second operator occupied a small compartment to the rear of the vehicle between the boiler and the engine, this man was responsible for looking after the boiler's water level and selecting reverse gear when required. The final man stood on a platform at the rear and was responsible for maintaining the fire and braking, which was carried out by means of a large lever which acted directly on one of the rear wheels. Nothing is known about how these three people communicated.

The service was brought to an end due to a dispute between Hancock and the operators, and Hancock himself built and operated further steam buses between 1833 and 1840, with names like Era I, Era II, Autopsy and German drag.

"Automaton"
In 1836 Hancock introduced the 22 seat Automaton, which ran over 700 journeys between London and Paddington, London and Islington, and Moorgate and Stratford, carrying over 12,000 passengers in total and regularly travelling at 12 to 15 miles per hour, with a top speed in excess of 20 mph.

Demise of steam
By 1840, the development of steam-powered road vehicles had lost impetus and the heavy road tolls imposed by the Turnpike Acts had turned inventors away from steam power, except on rails. Hancock was forced to give up the struggle, and the way was left clear for the operators of horse-drawn buses.

Hancock continued working with steam and supplied a light engine (similar to his steam road coaches) to the Eastern Counties Railway.

Statistics
Hancock compiled some statistics of his operations. Hancock's statistics also included the hours in service each day, which averaged 5 hrs 17 mins per vehicle, while the average time taken to make the  round trip from Moorgate to Paddington was 1 hr 10 mins.

See also
 History of steam road vehicles

 References 

Further reading
 James, Francis. Walter Hancock and his Common Road Steam Carriages''. Laurence Oxley, Alresford 1975

External links
 A working replica of Hancock's Enterprise
 Contemporary account of a trip to Brighton aboard the Infant

1799 births
1852 deaths
English inventors
Locomotive builders and designers
People of the Industrial Revolution
People from Marlborough, Wiltshire
Steam buses
Steam road vehicles